The  was one of the most destructive seismic events in Japanese history. It resulted in two tsunami waves which destroyed about 9,000 homes and caused at least 22,000 deaths.

From the tsunami records the estimated tsunami's magnitude is (Mt = 8.2), much greater than expected for the seismic magnitude estimated from the observed seismic intensity (=7.2). This earthquake is now regarded as being part of a distinct class of seismic events, the tsunami earthquake.

Geology

The epicenter lies just to the west of the Japan Trench, the surface expression of the west-dipping subduction zone. The trench forms part of the convergent boundary between the Pacific and Eurasian plates.

Magnitude
The unusual disparity between the magnitude of the earthquake and the subsequent tsunami may be due to a combination of factors:
 the tsunami was caused by a slope failure triggered by the earthquake
 the rupture velocity was unusually low
Scientists believe the effect of subducted sediment beneath the accretionary wedge was responsible for a slow rupture velocity. The effects of a 20° dipping fault along the top of the subducting plate was found to match both the observed seismic response and tsunami, but required a displacement of 10.4 m. The displacement was reduced to a more reasonable value after the extra uplift caused by the deformation of sediments in the wedge and a shallower fault dip of 10° was considered. This revised fault model gave a magnitude of =8.0–8.1. A figure much closer to the estimated actual tsunami magnitude. A magnitude of 8.5 on the moment magnitude scale has also been estimated for this event.

Tsunami
On the evening of June 15, 1896, communities along the Sanriku coast in northern Japan were celebrating a Shinto holiday and the return of soldiers from the First Sino-Japanese War. After a small earthquake, there was little concern because it was so weak and many small tremors had also been felt in the previous few months. However, 35 minutes later the first tsunami wave struck the coast, followed by a second a few minutes later. The damage was particularly severe because the tsunamis coincided with high tides. Most deaths occurred in Iwate and Miyagi although casualties were also recorded from Aomori and Hokkaido.

The power of the tsunami was great: large numbers of victims were found with broken bodies or missing limbs. As was their normal practise each evening, the local fishing fleets were all at sea when the tsunamis struck. In the deepwater, the wave went unnoticed. Only when they returned the next morning did they discover the debris and bodies.

They destroyed wharves and swept several houses away.

The word tsunami (from tsu "harbor" + nami "waves.") was coined in consecuence of this disaster.

Legacy
Preventive coastal measures were not implemented until after another tsunami struck in 1933. Due to higher levels of tsunami awareness, fewer casualties were recorded following the Sanriku earthquake. Nevertheless, the earthquake of 11 March 2011 caused a huge tsunami that resulted in thousands of deaths across the same region and the nuclear disaster at Fukushima.

See also
869 Sanriku earthquake
1933 Sanriku earthquake
2011 Tōhoku earthquake and tsunami
List of earthquakes in Japan
List of historical earthquakes
Seismicity of the Sanriku coast

References

Megathrust earthquakes in Japan
Tsunamis in Japan
Meiji-Sanriku earthquake
Meiji-Sanriku earthquake
Meiji-Sanriku earthquake
Earthquakes in the Empire of Japan
June 1896 events
Tsunami earthquakes
Earthquakes of the Meiji period
1896 disasters in Japan